David Lang may refer to:

David Lang (Civil War) (1838–1917), American Civil War officer
David Lang (rugby union) (1852–?), Scottish rugby union player
David Lang (screenwriter) (1913—2007), screenwriter
David Marshall Lang (1924–1991), historian
David Lang (composer) (born 1957), American composer
David Lang (American football) (1967–2005), American football running back
David Lång (born 1972), Swedish politician

See also 
David Lange (1942–2005), Prime Minister of New Zealand
David Laing (disambiguation)